Es ist Juli (It is July) is the debut studio album by German band Juli. It was released on September 20, 2004 via Universal Records. The album debuted at number three on the German Albums Chart and later peaked at number 2. With more than 700,000 copies sold until March 2005, it gained triple platinum.

Track listing

Charts

Weekly charts

Year-end charts

Certifications and sales

References

External links
 juli.tv — official site

2004 debut albums
Juli (band) albums
German-language albums
European Border Breakers Award-winning albums